Laura Cerón (born September 28, 1964) is an Alma Award-winning Mexican-born American actress. Her most recognizable role is that of Nurse Chuny Marquez on the television series ER.

Early life
Cerón was born in Mexico City, Mexico. She moved to Elgin, Illinois at the age of 10. She is the third oldest of two brothers and three sisters. In junior high school she became involved with theater. After leaving high school she joined the Latino Chicago Theater Company and went on to become one of their leading actresses. She has performed in dozens of plays, including Each Day Dies With Sleep, Heroes and Saints, and Federico García Lorca's Once Five Years Pass.

Career
Cerón's first film appearance was in the 1992 movie The Public Eye, starring Joe Pesci. This was followed by a small part in the 1995 movie Losing Isaiah. After playing the recurring role of Anita Marrón on the short-lived 1993–1994 ABC drama Missing Persons, Cerón joined the supporting cast of the NBC drama ER in 1995, near the end of its first season. Cerón was one of only six actors to appear in every season of ER until the final episode in April 2009. She guest-starred in Strong Medicine in 2004. In 2009, she starred in the fifth installment of Bring It On alongside Christina Milian.

Filmography

Awards and nominations

See also

List of Mexican Americans

References

External links
 
 

1964 births
Living people
Mexican emigrants to the United States
American actresses of Mexican descent
American film actresses
American television actresses
21st-century American women